The Cape May warbler (Setophaga tigrina) is a species of New World warbler. It breeds in northern North America. Its breeding range spans all but the westernmost parts of southern Canada, the Great Lakes region, and New England. It is migratory, wintering in the West Indies. This species is a very rare vagrant to western Europe, with two records in Britain as of October 2013. The English name refers to Cape May, New Jersey, where George Ord collected the specimen later described by Alexander Wilson. This species was not recorded again in Cape May for another 100 years, although it is now known as an uncommon migrant there.

Etymology

Description 

This bird is a small passerine and is a mid-sized New World warbler. The adult male Cape May warbler has a brown back, yellowish rump and dark brown crown. The underparts are yellow streaked with black, giving rise to the bird's scientific name. The throat and nape are bright yellow and the face has a striking chestnut patch framed in yellow with a black eyestripe. There is a narrow white wing bar.

Plumages of the female and immature male resemble washed-out versions of the adult male, lacking the strong head pattern. The yellowish rump, and at least indications of the white wing bar, are always present.

Biology 
This species is insectivorous and lays larger clutches in years when spruce budworm is abundant. It picks insects from the tips of conifer branches or flies out to catch insects. The Cape May warbler also feeds on berry juice and nectar in winter, and has, uniquely for a warbler, a tubular tongue to facilitate this behavior.

The breeding habitat of this bird is the edges of coniferous woodland. Cape May warblers nest in dense foliage near the trunk of the tree, commonly the black spruce, and lay 4–9 eggs in a cup nest. This species can lay the largest clutch of any New World warbler, probably in response to increases in the numbers of spruce budworm during outbreaks.

The song of the Cape May warbler is a simple repetition of high tsi notes. The call is a thin sip. This bird usually sings from high perches.

References

External links

 Cape May warbler – Dendroica tigrina – USGS Patuxent Bird Identification InfoCenter
 Cape May warbler Species Account – Cornell Lab of Ornithology
 
 

Cape May warbler
Birds of Canada
Birds of the Dominican Republic
Cape May warbler
Taxa named by Johann Friedrich Gmelin
Birds of the United States